West View Schoolhouse was a historic public school building located at Weyers Cave, Augusta County, Virginia. It has since been demolished. It was a two-room schoolhouse with the first room built about 1875, and the second added by 1890.  It was of frame construction with a limestone and brick foundation.  The interior was considered the least altered and best preserved of all the surviving one- and two-room schools in Augusta County.

It was listed on the National Register of Historic Places in 1985.

References

School buildings on the National Register of Historic Places in Virginia
School buildings completed in 1890
Schools in Augusta County, Virginia
National Register of Historic Places in Augusta County, Virginia
1890 establishments in Virginia